During World War II, the U.S. Army Air Forces (USAAF) established numerous airfields in Arkansas for training fighter and bomber pilots and aircrews.

Most of the airfields were under the command of Third Air Force or the U.S. Army Air Forces Training Command (USAAFTC), present-day Air Education and Training Command. However the other USAAF support commands (Air Technical Service Command (ATSC); Air Transport Command (ATC) or Troop Carrier Command) commanded a significant number of airfields in a support roles.

It is still possible to find remnants of these wartime airfields. Many were converted into municipal airports, some were returned to agriculture and several were retained as United States Air Force installations and were front-line bases during the Cold War. Hundreds of the temporary buildings that were used survive today, and are being used for other purposes.

Major Airfields
Army Air Force Training CommandSoutheast Training Center/AAF Eastern Flying Training Command
 Blytheville Army Air Field, 3 miles north of Blytheville
 Army Air Forces Advanced Flying School (Two Engine) / Army Air Forces Pilot School (Advanced, Two Engine); 3 May 1942-31 May 1945
 326th Base Headquarters and Air Base Squadron; 21 July 1942-30 April 1944
 2111th Army Air Forces Base Unit; 1 May 1944-16 June 1945
 Became Blytheville Air Force Base / Eaker Air Force Base (1951-1992)
 Now: Arkansas International Airport  (1992-Present)

 Newport Army Air Field, 6 miles northeast of Newport
 Army Air Forces Basic Flying School/Army Air Forces Pilot School (Basic); 1 November 1942-30 April 1944
 337th Base Headquarters and Air Base Squadron; 24 November 1942-30 April 1944
 Later: Marine Corps Air Facility Newport
 Now: Newport Municipal Airport (M19)

 Stuttgart Army Air Field, 5 miles north of Stuttgart
 Army Air Forces Advanced Flying School (Two Engine)/Army Air Forces Pilot School (Advanced, Two Engine); 20 September 1942-7 February 1945
 426th Base Headquarters and Air Base Squadron; 20 September 1942-30 April 1944
 2141st Army Air Forces Base Unit (AAFEFTC); 1 May 1944-7 February 1945
 314th Army Air Forces Base Unit (Third AF); 7 February 1945-8 December 1945
 Now: Stuttgart Municipal Airport (SGT)

 Walnut Ridge Army Air Field, 4 miles north of Walnut Ridge
 Army Air Forces Basic Flying School/Army Air Forces Pilot School (Basic); 15 August 1942-1 September 1944
 323th Base Headquarters and Air Base Squadron; 25 August 1942-30 April 1944
 Later: Marine Corps Air Facility Walnut Ridge
 Now: Walnut Ridge Regional Airport (ARG)

 Adams Field, 4 miles east of Little Rock
 (Joint use USAAF/Civil Airport)
 12th Ferrying Service Detachment/12th Ferrying Service Station; 1 December 1943-31 March 1944
 581st Army Air Forces Base Unit (12th Ferrying Service Station); 31 March 1944-20 September 1945
 Now: Clinton National Airport 

 Grider Field, 5 miles east of Pine Bluff
 Pine Bluff School of Aviation 
 312th Flying Training Detachment
 Now: Pine Bluff Regional Airport

Known Secondary Facilities
Carlisle (26 mi. NW Stuttgart)
Cooter (10 mi. NE Blytheville)
Erwin Auxiliary Army Airfield (near Newport)
Hazen (19 mi. NNW Stuttgart)
Hope Army Air Field (3 mi. NE Hope)
Manila (13 mi. W Blytheville)
Praireville (8 mi. SE Stuttgart)
Steele (12 mi. N Blytheville)
Ridge Army Air Base (4 mi. NE Walnut Ridge)

References
 Maurer, Maurer (1983). Air Force Combat Units Of World War II. Maxwell AFB, Alabama: Office of Air Force History. .
 Ravenstein, Charles A. (1984). Air Force Combat Wings Lineage and Honors Histories 1947-1977. Maxwell AFB, Alabama: Office of Air Force History. .
 Thole, Lou (1999), Forgotten Fields of America : World War II Bases and Training, Then and Now - Vol. 2.  Pictorial Histories Pub . 

World War II
 01
Airfields of the United States Army Air Forces in the United States by state
World War II
American Theater of World War II
United States World War II army airfields